Airtrain (also known as the Airport railway line) is the privately owned commuter railway line that extends  northeast from Brisbane ( from Central station by rail), the state capital of Queensland, to Brisbane Airport (BNE) at both its separate International and Domestic terminals. It was opened in 2001.

The line is carried on an elevated prestressed concrete viaduct for its entire  length after branching off from the Queensland Rail City network at Eagle Junction railway station.

Ownership and business
The Airtrain service is a private enterprise. The line is owned and operated by Airtrain Citylink Limited, with financial backing from Transfield Services, Macquarie Bank, Colonial First State and ABN AMRO. The first service ran on 5 May 2001. Airtrain Citylink has a licence from Queensland Transport under a BOOT scheme – build, own, operate and transfer – to build the rail line, to own and operate it, and hand entire infrastructure over to the Queensland Government after 35 years when the company will then cease to exist.

The line connects seamlessly with the Queensland Rail City network and services use City network rolling stock in a commercial agreement with QR. While City network rolling stock is used, Airtrain does not form part of the TransLink integrated public transport scheme, and therefore fares are not subsidised by the government. As a result, travel between the airport and City network stations in the Brisbane central business district costs $19.80 one way and $37.60 return (as of December 2022; cheaper on-line). Travel on Airtrain services between ordinary City network stations, not involving airport travel, is charged at the normal TransLink rate, including concession (pensioner) rates.

In 2008, Brisbane's Airtrain ran an operating profit of $4.8 million, allowing Airtrain to pay dividends of $1.95 to its shareholders.
Airtain is not subsidised by the Queensland Government, and its $220 million construction cost was entirely privately financed. This makes it one of a few known profitable public transport systems.

Patronage
Initial passenger numbers on the service were well below expectations and the company nearly faced voluntary administration in 2003. However, in May 2005, Airtrain operated at a profit for the first time due to significant passenger growth – 1.12 million passengers in the 2004–2005 financial year, an increase of 40% – and a complex company restructure that cut costs by nearly half.

Passenger numbers on the service have also steadily increased, now close to two million passengers each year. In 2008, 6% of visitors to the airport used an Airtrain service. This figure rose to 8% in 2011.

Line guide and services
Commencing at the Domestic Terminal, all services stop at the International Terminal and then all stations though the Brisbane CBD to at least Roma Street. The typical travel time between Domestic Terminal and Brisbane City is approximately 22 minutes (to Central).

Airport line services run every fifteen minutes during the morning and afternoon weekday peak hours, and every half hour during the off-peak. Most services continue as Gold Coast line services.

Passengers for/from the Doomben, Caboolture, Shorncliffe and Redcliffe Peninsula lines change at Eagle Junction, Ferny Grove and Nambour and Gympie North lines at Bowen Hills, and all other lines at Central.

Proposed Skygate station
Brisbane Airport Corporation has proposed a new station at its Skygate retail park at the south-western edge of the airport. Discussions have taken place with Airtrain Holdings Limited and the Queensland Government.

Gallery

See also

Queensland Rail City network
TransLink

References

External links
Airtrain
Citytrain
TransLink

Brisbane railway lines
Public transport in Queensland
Brisbane Airport
Brisbane
Railway lines opened in 2001
3 ft 6 in gauge railways in Australia
2001 establishments in Australia